Cordingly is a surname. Notable people with the surname include:

Beth Cordingly (born 1976), English actress
David Cordingly (born 1938), English naval historian
Eric Cordingly (1911–1976), British Anglican bishop

See also
Cordingley